Matti Friedman is a Canadian-Israeli journalist and author.  He is an op-ed contributor for the New York Times, and columnist for Tablet magazine.

Biography
Matti Friedman was born to a Canadian Jewish family and grew up in Toronto. His family attended an Orthodox synagogue. In 1995, he immigrated to Israel at the age of seventeen and settled in Ma'ale Gilboa. His parents and sister joined him a year later.

He was conscripted into the Israel Defense Forces and served in the Nahal Brigade. He was deployed to the Israeli security zone in southern Lebanon during the South Lebanon conflict in the late 1990s, spending much of his service at an Israeli position called Outpost Pumpkin, the name of which was to inspire the title of a book he later wrote about his experiences in Lebanon. Following his military service he studied at the Hebrew University of Jerusalem.

Friedman is married with three children and lives in Jerusalem. His wife is the descendant of an Old Yishuv Jewish family with roots in the old Sephardi community of Jerusalem and Hebron.

Career

AP journalist
Between 2006 and the end of 2011, Friedman was a reporter and editor in the Jerusalem bureau of the Associated Press (AP) news agency. During his journalistic career, he also worked as a reporter in Egypt, Morocco, Lebanon, Moscow and Washington, D.C.  Friedman first drew wide attention with a pair of essays  about anti-Israel media bias that included sharp criticism of the AP.

The Aleppo Codex
Friedman's book, The Aleppo Codex: A True Story of Obsession, Faith and the Pursuit of an Ancient Bible, published in May 2012 by Algonquin Books, is an account of how the Aleppo Codex, "the oldest, most complete, most accurate text of the Hebrew Bible," came to reside in Israel. It was believed that many pages had disappeared from the codex during the 1947 Anti-Jewish riots in Aleppo when the Central Synagogue of Aleppo, where the codex was housed, was set on fire and badly damaged. Friedman concludes instead that it arrived in Israel essentially intact, and that a particular Israeli scholar (whom he names) was most likely responsible for the loss. Moreover, contrary to the usual understanding that the codex was willingly given to the state of Israel, Friedman reports the sealed transcripts of a court battle in which the Jews of Aleppo attempted to recover it from the state.

The book won the 2014 Sami Rohr Prize for Jewish Literature, was selected as one of Booklist's top ten religion and spirituality books of 2012, was awarded the American Library Association's 2013 Sophie Brody Medal and the 2013 Canadian Jewish Book Award for history, and received second place for the Religion Newswriters Association's 2013 nonfiction religion book of the year.

Pumpkinflowers: South Lebanon conflict
Friedman's 2016 book, Pumpkinflowers: A Soldier's Story of a Forgotten War, is about his experiences as an IDF soldier during the South Lebanon conflict.

Spies of No Country: pre-independence agents
In 2019 Friedman published Spies of No Country: Secret Lives at the Birth of Israel, the story of four Arabic-speaking Jews who operated an Israeli, pre-independence Zionist intelligence unit, the "Arab Section," in Beirut, then in the territory of the French Mandate for Syria and the Lebanon towards the end of the British Mandate for Palestine. The book won the 2018 Natan Book Award.

Views and opinions
Following the 2014 Israel–Gaza conflict, Friedman wrote an essay criticizing what he views as the international media's bias against Israel and undue focus on the country, stating that news organizations treat it as "most important story on earth". He said when he was a correspondent at the AP,  Israeli newspaper Haaretz reported that the piece went "viral" on Facebook.  The Atlantic then invited Friedman to write a longer article. AP issued a statement, saying that Friedman's "... arguments have been filled with distortions, half-truths and inaccuracies, both about the recent Gaza war and more distant events. His suggestion of AP bias against Israel is false".
Veteran journalist Mark Lavie, who worked at the AP's Jerusalem bureau, agrees with Friedman's charges leveled against the AP.

Published works

The Aleppo Codex: A True Story of Obsession, Faith and the Pursuit of an Ancient Bible, 2012
Pumpkinflowers: A Soldier’s Story, 2016
Spies of No Country: Secret Lives at the Birth of Israel, 2019
Who by Fire: Leonard Cohen in the Sinai, 2022

See also
Media of Israel

References

External links
 
 Book Review, Winning the War of Words: Essays on Zionism and Israel - Fathom Journal
Fathom Journal - ‘Telling Israel’s story in the 21st century will have a lot less to do with the Warsaw Ghetto than it will with Kurdistan and Aleppo.’ An interview with Matti Friedman

Jewish Canadian writers
Canadian emigrants to Israel
Living people
Associated Press reporters
Israeli journalists
Writers from Toronto
Year of birth missing (living people)